The thirty-first edition of the Caribbean Series (Serie del Caribe) was held from February 4 through February 9 of  with the champion baseball teams of the Dominican Republic, Leones del Escogido; Mexico, Águilas de Mexicali; Puerto Rico, Indios de Mayagüez, and Venezuela, Águilas del Zulia. The format consisted of 12 games, each team facing the other teams twice, and the games were played at Estadio Teodoro Mariscal in Mazatlán, Mexico.

Summary

Final standings

Individual leaders

All-Star team

See also
Ballplayers who have played in the Series

Sources
Nuñez, José Antero (1994). Serie del Caribe de la Habana a Puerto La Cruz. JAN Editor.

External links
Estadísticas Serie del Caribe 1989 (Spanish)

Caribbean Series
1989
International baseball competitions hosted by Mexico
1989 in Mexican sports
Mazatlán
1989 in Caribbean sport
Caribbean Series